Latasha Harlins (January 1, 1976 – March 16, 1991) was an African-American girl who was fatally shot at age 15 by Soon Ja Du, a 49-year-old Korean-American convenience store owner. Du was tried and convicted of voluntary manslaughter over the killing of Harlins, based in part on security camera footage. The judge sentenced Du to 10 years in state prison but the sentence was suspended and the defendant was instead placed on five years' probation with 400 hours of community service, a $500 restitution, and funeral expenses. The sentencing was widely regarded as an extremely light sentence, and a failed appeal contributed to the 1992 Los Angeles riots, especially the targeting of Koreatown, Los Angeles, California. The killing of Harlins came 13 days after the videotaped beating of Rodney King.

Life 
Latasha Harlins was born January 1, 1976, in East St. Louis, Illinois, to Crystal Harlins and Sylvester "Vester" Acoff Sr. Latasha had one younger brother, Vester Acoff Jr., and one younger sister, Christina. The family moved from Illinois to South Central Los Angeles in 1981. In 1982, when Latasha was six years old, her father took a job in a steel foundry while her mother worked as a waitress in a local tavern. They lived near 89th St. and Broadway, just a few blocks from where Latasha would be killed ten years later.
 
Acoff Sr. was known to be abusive towards Crystal, attacking and beating her in front of Latasha and her younger siblings. Their unstable marriage eventually ended in 1983. On November 27, 1985, Crystal was brutally shot dead outside a Los Angeles nightclub by Cora Mae Anderson, Acoff's new girlfriend, leaving Latasha and her younger siblings in the care of their maternal grandmother, Ruth Harlins. The death of her mother had a devastating impact on Latasha, who began to rebel and argue with her maternal grandmother and her maternal aunt Denise. At the time of her own death in 1991, Latasha was a student at Westchester High School. She was buried next to her mother in Paradise Memorial Park, Santa Fe Springs, California.

Death 
Soon Ja Du's store, Empire Liquor, was located at the intersection of West 91st Street and South Figueroa Street, Vermont Vista, Los Angeles, and was normally staffed by Du's husband and son. However, on the morning of the shooting, Du was working behind the counter, and her husband was outside resting in the family van.

Shortly before 10:00 a.m. on Saturday, March 16, Harlins entered the store. Du observed Harlins putting a $1.79 bottle of orange juice in her backpack. Du concluded Harlins was attempting to steal, and did not see the money Harlins held in her hand. Du claimed to have asked Harlins if she intended to pay for the orange juice, to which Du claimed Harlins responded, "What orange juice?" Two eyewitnesses—9-year-old Ismail Ali and his 13-year-old sister Lakeshia Combs—disputed that claim, saying that Du called Harlins a "bitch" and accused her of trying to steal, to which they claimed Harlins replied that she intended to pay for the orange juice. After speaking with the two eyewitnesses present and viewing the videotape of the incident, recorded by a store security camera, the police concluded that Harlins intended to pay for the beverage with money in hand. The videotape showed that Du grabbed Harlins by her sweater and snatched her backpack. Harlins then struck Du with her fist twice, knocking Du to the ground. After Harlins backed away, Du angrily threw a stool at her. Harlins then picked up the orange juice bottle that dropped during the scuffle and handed it to Du, who snatched the bottle from her, and Harlins turned to leave. The gunshot struck Harlins in the back of the head, killing her instantly. Du's husband, Billy Heung Ki Du, heard the gunshot and rushed into the store. After speaking to his wife, who asked for the whereabouts of Harlins before fainting, he dialed 9-1-1 to report an attempted holdup.

Trial 
Soon Ja Du testified on her own behalf, claiming that the shooting was in self-defense and that she believed her life was in danger. But her testimony was contradicted by the statements of the two witnesses present at the time, as well as the store's security camera video, which showed Du shooting Harlins in the back of the head as she turned away from Du and attempted to leave the store. The Los Angeles Police Department ballistics report also found that the handgun Du used was altered in such a way that it required much less pressure on the trigger to fire than an ordinary handgun.

Decision and sentence 
On November 15, 1991, a jury found that Du's decision to fire the gun was fully within her control and that she fired the gun voluntarily. The jury found Du guilty of voluntary manslaughter, an offense that carries a maximum prison sentence of 16 years. However, the trial judge, Joyce Karlin, sentenced Du to five years of probation, 10 years of suspended prison, 400 hours of community service, and a $500 fine.

Judge Karlin suggested that there were mitigating circumstances in the killing of Harlins. She stated, "Did Mrs. Du react inappropriately? Absolutely. But was that reaction understandable? I think that it was." Karlin added, "this is not a time for revenge... and no matter what sentence this court imposes Mrs. Du will be punished every day for the rest of her life." The court also stated that Du shot Harlins under extreme provocation and duress and deemed it unlikely that Du would ever commit a serious crime again. Furthermore, Karlin deemed that Du's capacity to act rationally in the situation was undermined by her experience with past robberies.

California Court of Appeal 
A state appeals court later unanimously upheld Judge Karlin's sentencing decision, 3–0, on April 21, 1992, about a week before the LA riots. In July 1992, Latasha's brother and sister received a $300,000 settlement from a civil suit brought against Soon Ja Du, which was paid by the store's insurance policy.

Effects 
The incident and reduced sentencing by the court exacerbated the existing tensions between African-American residents and Korean-American merchants in South Central Los Angeles. Those tensions were later interpreted by some members of the public and activists as being one of the catalysts for the 1992 Los Angeles riots. The Los Angeles mayor's office estimated that 65 percent of all businesses vandalized during the riots were Korean-owned. On August 17, 1991, while Du was awaiting trial, a small fire occurred at her store.

During the 1992 riots, Du's store was looted and burned down; it never reopened. The property later became a market under different ownership.

Effect on black and Korean relations 
After the widely publicized shooting of Latasha Harlins, relations between the black and Korean communities continued to deteriorate rapidly. Despite intervention from leaders of both communities, the time after the death of Latasha Harlins was characterized by boycotts, tense debate, bitterness, Molotov cocktails, and more convenience store murders. However, while tensions had exponentially increased because of the killing of Harlins, they were built on existing conflict that had been present in the community. Korean immigrant shop-owners had a growing presence in black communities since before the 1970s. Since then, they had been a target of anger from both black shop-owners and black customers, with incompatible claims from either group that say Korean shop-owners "undercut prices" by the shop-owners and that they overcharged customers.

In 1984, seven years before Harlins was shot, an editorial was posted in a black community newspaper urging a boycott of Korean stores, saying that any black person who went to their stores was a 'traitor'. Korean immigrants bought their storefronts in black neighborhoods, specifically South Los Angeles, because the real estate was significantly cheaper than other neighborhoods. The distrust ran possibly even further, because in the same editorial the writer exclaims, "The real question is, why was my brother's brains blown out fighting for those Koreans?" in reference to the Korean War. Further, the stereotypes of the two groups were a source of contention, with black people often being labeled as economically "dependent", with Koreans and other Asians often labeled economically self-sufficient.

Tensions only continued to mount, particularly after police officers were found not guilty of beating Rodney King. These events were considered factors in deadly and destructive riots which began on April 29, 1992, and continued through May 4, 1992. Many of the targets of looting and destruction were Korean stores; more than two thousand Korean stores burned or looted. Though these ethnic tensions have not resulted in wide-scale violence since 1992, the relationship between Koreans and the black community was still strained as of 1996. Recent years have seen improved relations between the two communities, as a younger generation of Korean-American LA residents showed up in great numbers—in some cases even organizing protests—to support the Black Lives Matter movement during the summer of 2020.

Los Angeles riots in 1992 
The killing of Latasha Harlins was one of many events in Los Angeles that may have led to the riots in 1992. In the eyes of many in the black community, it was tragic that Soon Ja Du did not receive any jail time for her crime. While the jury convicted Du of manslaughter, which normally carries a maximum of 16 years in prison, the judge, Joyce Karlin, commuted her sentence to probation and a $500 fine—this angered many in the black community, as well as other community members, who felt that the sentencing set a dangerous precedent. The sentencing of Soon Ja Du reflected that of the police officers who beat Rodney King. In both cases, there was video evidence depicting wrongdoing and in both cases, the defendants did not serve any jail time. After the verdict in King's case was delivered, massive riots ensued in Los Angeles, protesting the miscarriage of justice for black victims and racial inequality. While King's case was the immediate catalyst to the violence, cases like that of Harlins fueled anger and demonstrated injustices against black people, which ultimately led to the riots.

Judge Joyce Karlin Fahey 
Karlin's rulings in the case prompted Los Angeles County District Attorney Ira Reiner to instruct his deputies to effectively bar Judge Karlin from trying cases by invoking a statute to remove a judge for any reason. In justifying his directive, he said "[t]his was such a stunning miscarriage of justice that Judge Karlin cannot continue to hear criminal cases with any public credibility."

Karlin became the target of protests and an unsuccessful recall campaign. Denise Harlins, the maternal aunt of Latasha Harlins, led protests outside Karlin's home and the Compton courthouse. Protesters noted that a week after the death of Latasha Harlins, a Glendale man received a more severe sentence than Du for kicking a dog. After the Los Angeles Times endorsed one of her opponents in her re-election campaign, she wrote a letter to the newspaper, saying "[I]f judges have to look over their shoulders as they decide a case; if they have to test the political winds in order to arrive at a politically correct verdict—then the judicial system and the freedoms it guarantees will be destroyed." The Harlins family held vigils outside the Du residence every year on the anniversary of her sentencing.

Denise Harlins interrupted an awards ceremony at the Biltmore Hotel for Du defense attorney Charles Lloyd. Karlin and Du's son also attended that ceremony. "All you people sitting, applauding over a child killer," Harlins yelled. "Latasha was defenseless. She didn't do nothing!" After Denise Harlins was removed from the ballroom, Karlin gave a speech, stating "There are those in the community who demand that we define justice by what is politically correct. I think that we must unanimously reject such demands ... What's politically correct today may not be politically correct tomorrow or the next day. But what is justice today is justice always. ... I for one am sick and tired of less than five percent of this community trying to tell the rest of us what to do, what to think, and what to say." Karlin was re-elected to the Superior Court bench by a reduced margin from previous elections. She then moved to Juvenile Dependency Court, a transfer she had requested before the Du case. "I have been honored to spend the last 20 years serving the public but now I want to devote time to my family," Karlin wrote. Karlin resigned from the bench in 1997. Upon hearing of retirement, Denise Harlins stated, "I'm glad to hear that she's removed herself from the bench and that she's retired. But she didn't belong [on the bench] anyway." Since retiring from the bench Karlin has used her husband's surname Fahey.

Representation in culture

In music 
Hip hop artist 2Pac took particular note of the death of Harlins and in 1993 released a song titled "Keep Ya Head Up" which was dedicated to Latasha Harlins. Thereafter, Shakur made frequent mention of Harlins in his songs, including in tracks like "Something 2 Die 4 (Interlude)" ("Latasha Harlins, remember that name... 'Cause a bottle of juice is not something to die for"), "Thugz Mansion" ("Little Latasha, sho' grown/Tell the lady in the liquor store that she's forgiven/So come home"), "I Wonder If Heaven Got a Ghetto" ("Tell me what's a black life worth/A bottle of juice is no excuse, the truth hurts/And even when you take the shit/Move counties get a lawyer, you can shake the shit/Ask Rodney, Latasha, and many more"), "White Mans World" ("Rest in Peace to Latasha, Little Yummy, and Kato"), "Hellrazor" ("Dear Lord if ya hear me, tell me why/Little girl like Latasha, had to die") and "N.I.G.G.A." ("Korean motherfuckers was crooked/So niggas had to burn and loot 'em [...] Lickin' off shots for Latasha, that's proper").

Rapper Ice Cube composed a song about the incident for his album Death Certificate titled "Black Korea".

Singer-songwriter Gabriel Kahane composed "Empire Liquor Mart (9127 S. Figueroa St.)" for the album The Ambassador in 2014, which tells the story of Latasha's life and the event that transpired.

In literature 
Steph Cha's novel Your House Will Pay centers on the aftermath of the murder of a 16-year-old African-American girl in South Central Los Angeles. It is a fictionalized account of the killing of Latasha Harlins and the effects on both her family and the family of the shooter.

In her book American Dream, Sapphire wrote the poem Strange Juice (or the murder of Latasha Harlins) giving voice to the murdered girl.

In film and television 
The short documentary film A Love Song for Latasha (2019) gives some biographical background on the life of Latasha Harlins, drawing on memories from her cousin and her best friend. Directed by Sophia Nahli Allison, it was nominated for an Academy Award for Best Documentary Short Subject at the 93rd Academy Awards in 2021.

In memorial 
In 1998, the California State Assembly named April 29 as Latasha Harlins Day.

In early 2021, a mural celebrating Latasha Harlins was unveiled in front of Algin Sutton Recreation Center. The mural was created by visual artist Victoria Cassinova.

See also 

Killing of Vincent Chin
Emmett Till

References 

1991 crimes in the United States
African-American–Asian-American relations
Deaths by person in Los Angeles
Filmed killings
1992 Los Angeles riots
1991 in California
March 1991 events in the United States
Murdered African-American people
Murdered American children
Murder in Los Angeles
Deaths by firearm in California
Filmed deaths in the United States
Incidents of violence against girls